The Boy from Indiana is a 1950 American sports drama film directed by John Rawlins and starring Lon McCallister, Billie Burke and George Cleveland. The film's sets were designed by the art director Lucius O. Croxton.

Cast
 Lon McCallister as Lon Decker
 Lois Butler as Betty Richards
 Billie Burke as Zelda Bagley
 George Cleveland as Robert Bruce Mac Dougall
 Allen Church as Corbett
 Jerry Ambler as Burke
 Rol Laughner as Wilkinson
 Victor Cox as Thorne
 Robert Pollard as Dr. Huffins
 William Peterson as Dr. Maynard
 Herb Jacobs as Harry
 Jeanne Patterson as Pretty Girl

References

Bibliography
 Davis, Blair. The Battle for the Bs: 1950s Hollywood and the Rebirth of Low-Budget Cinema. Rutgers University Press, 2012,

External links
 

1950 films
1950 drama films
1950s English-language films
American sports drama films
Films directed by John Rawlins
Eagle-Lion Films films
1950s sports drama films
American horse racing films
1950s American films